Lane Field  is a privately owned, public use airport located two nautical miles (4 km) east of the central business district of Sanger, in Denton County, Texas, United States. The airport is used solely for general aviation purposes.

Facilities and aircraft 
Lane Field covers an area of 43 acres (17 ha) at an elevation of 700 feet (213 m) above mean sea level. It has one runway designated 17/35 with a turf surface measuring 3,340 by 130 feet (1,018 x 40 m).

For the 12-month period ending March 6, 2009, the airport had 70 general aviation aircraft operations.

References

External links 
  at Texas DOT Airport Directory
 Aerial image as of January 1995 from USGS The National Map
 

Defunct airports in Texas
Airports in Texas
Airports in the Dallas–Fort Worth metroplex
Transportation in Denton County, Texas
Buildings and structures in Denton County, Texas